"I Was a Teenage Anarchist" is a song by the Gainesville, Florida-based punk rock band Against Me!, released as the first single from their 2010 album White Crosses. The single was released as a four-track digital download through various online music stores on April 6, 2010, including the additional album track "Rapid Decompression" and two B-sides from the album's sessions, "One by One" and "Bitter Divisions". A 7" single was released on April 17 in conjunction with Record Store Day, with an acoustic version of "I Was a Teenage Anarchist" featuring as the B-side.

Music video
The music video for the song features Laura Jane Grace in traditional punk clothing running through a park being chased by a police officer, who tackles and then starts beating her. After a while members of a crowd that had formed attack the officer, freeing Grace. However, these members are accosted by other officers. Grace begins to run away, only to be stopped by more police officers. At the end of the video Grace is shown being shoved into a police car, smiling after a few moments.
The video is shot in a single long take, entirely in slow motion.

Track listing 
All lyrics written by Laura Jane Grace, all music composed by Against Me!

Download version

7" version

Controversy and feud with Rise Against 
Lyrics from the song's hook, "Do you remember when you were young and you wanted to set the world on fire?", drew controversy when fellow American punk rock band Rise Against released their song "Architects" in 2011, containing the lyrics "Don't you remember when you were young and you wanted to set the world on fire? Somewhere deep down, I know you do. Don't you remember when you were young and you wanted to set the world on fire? Well I still am, and I still do!" The lyrics were interpreted as specifically responding to and calling out Against Me!'s song.

In an interview, Rise Against lead singer Tim McIlrath explained his reasoning behind the lyrical choice. "I felt like the Against Me! song was really dismissive of the fire in my belly, and fire in many of our fans' bellies. It was asking for, and deserved, a response... that line seemed to trivialize what many of us still hold on to unapologetically."

Grace responded to Rise Against's song in an interview, criticizing the band's politics and the ease at which the lyric "The revolution was a lie" angered McIlrath. In 2016, Grace stated that, despite being close with Rise Against and having toured with them in the past, "At the time it just seemed like posturing, you know? Like, 'Okay, whatever, sure. You’re more revolutionary than me. You can have it.'"

Personnel

Band 
 Laura Jane Grace – guitar, lead vocals
 James Bowman – guitar, backing vocals
 Andrew Seward – bass guitar, backing vocals
 George Rebelo – drums

Production 
 Butch Vig – producer

Charts

Weekly charts

Year-end charts

References 

2010 singles
Against Me! songs
Song recordings produced by Butch Vig
Record Store Day releases
Songs written by Laura Jane Grace
Sire Records singles
2010 songs